Senator Pierce may refer to:

Members of the United States Senate
Franklin Pierce (1804–1869), U.S. Senator from New Hampshire from 1837 to 1842
Gilbert A. Pierce (1838–1901), U.S. Senator from North Dakota from 1889 to 1891

United States state senate member
Bobby Pierce (politician), Arkansas State Senate
David Pierce (politician), New Hampshire State Senate
Edward C. Pierce (1930–2002), Michigan State Senate
George H. Pierce (1872–1967), New York State Senate
George T. Pierce (1820s–1874), New York State Senate
James F. Pierce (1830–1905), New York State Senate
Josiah Pierce (1792–1866), Maine State Senate
Loren R. Pierce (1878–1961), Vermont State Senate
Steve Pierce (born 1950), Arizona State Senate
Walter M. Pierce (1861–1954), Oregon State Senate

See also
William A. Pirce (1824–1891), Rhode Island State Senate
Senator Pearce (disambiguation)
Senator Peirce (disambiguation)